Florentia San Gimignano Società Sportiva Dilettantistica was an Italian women's association football club based in San Gimignano. It was founded in October 2015 and secured three successive promotions in its first three seasons, to enter Serie A in 2018. San Gimignano were dissolved on 15 June 2021 after selling their Serie A license to U.C. Sampdoria.

Ground
Upon their entry to Serie A in 2018, Florentia negotiated an agreement to share the stadium of local male club A.S.D. Giallo-Blu Figline.

Players

Current squad

Former players

Honours
Serie B: 2017–2018
Serie C: 2016–2017
Serie D: 2015–2016

References 

Defunct football clubs in Italy
Florentia
Football clubs in Tuscany
Association football clubs established in 2015
2015 establishments in Italy
Association football clubs disestablished in 2021
2021 disestablishments in Italy
Serie A (women's football) clubs